Ward House, also known as the William Allen House, is a historic home located at Westfield in Chautauqua County, New York. It is a 2-story, L-shaped brick Italian Villa–style residence built in the late 1860s.  The home features a prominent cupola, and the property has a -story frame barn.

It was listed on the National Register of Historic Places in 1983.

References

Houses on the National Register of Historic Places in New York (state)
Italianate architecture in New York (state)
Houses completed in 1860
Houses in Chautauqua County, New York
National Register of Historic Places in Chautauqua County, New York